TK McKamy is an American film director, screenwriter, and editor known for directing music videos.

Thomas Knox McKamy III was born in Stone Mountain, Georgia and raised in the small town of Nicholasville, Kentucky. The son of Knox and Lynn McKamy and the brother to Holly. An athlete, TK traveled the U.S. playing competitive soccer and baseball. He attended East Jessamine High School.

Music videos

Films

References

External links
 

American music video directors
Living people
1983 births
People from Stone Mountain, Georgia